Two-time defending champion Rafael Nadal defeated Novak Djokovic in the final, 6–4, 6–3, 2–6, 7–5 to win the men's singles tennis title at the 2012 French Open. It was his record-breaking seventh French Open title and eleventh major title overall, surpassing Björn Borg's record of six French Open titles and equaling Pete Sampras' Wimbledon record for the most men's singles titles at one major and Chris Evert's record for the most French Open singles titles.

Djokovic had the chance to become the first man since Rod Laver in 1969 to hold all four major titles at once, having won the previous year's Wimbledon and US Open titles as well as this year's Australian Open (all won over Nadal in the final). It was Djokovic's fourth consecutive loss to Nadal at Roland Garros, but the first time Djokovic won a set against Nadal at the tournament.

Roger Federer was attempting to become the first man in the Open Era and the third man ever to achieve a double career Grand Slam, but he lost to Djokovic in the semifinals.

Due to rain, the final was postponed to Monday, 11 June 2012 at 1:00 local time, after the score on Sunday was 6–4, 6–3, 2–6, 1–2 with Djokovic serving, after 3 hours of play of the 3:49 total length.

This was also the last major for 2001 Australian Open finalist and former world No. 10 Arnaud Clement, and the last French Open appearance for 2003 champion and former world No. 1 Juan Carlos Ferrero and former world No. 1 Andy Roddick.

Seeds

Qualifying

Draw

Finals

Top half

Section 1

Section 2

Section 3

Section 4

Bottom half

Section 5

Section 6

Section 7

Section 8

References

External links
Official Roland Garros 2012 Men's Singles Draw
 Main Draw
2012 French Open – Men's draws and results at the International Tennis Federation

Men's Singles
French Open - Men's Singles
French Open by year – Men's singles